6th DFCC Awards
December 23, 2011

Best Film: 
 Drive 
The 6th Dublin Film Critics' Circle Awards, given on December 23, 2011, honored the best in film for 2011.  The crime Drive became the most successful film of this year's ceremony, won three awards, including Best Film.

Awards

Top 10 Film
1. Drive
 
2. Black Swan
 
3. The Tree of Life
 
4. Tinker Tailor Soldier Spy
 
5. Melancholia
 
6. Take Shelter
 
7. Senna
 
8. True Grit
 
9. A Separation
 
10. Animal Kingdom

Top 10 Irish Film
1. The Guard
 
2. Snap
 
3. Sensation
 
4. Rewind
 
5. As If I Am Not There
 
6. One Hundred Mornings
 
7. Knuckle
 
8. The Runway
 
9. Between the Canals
 
10. Parked

Top 10 Directors
1. Nicolas Winding Refn, Drive
 
2. Terrence Malick, The Tree of Life
 
3. Darren Aronofsky, Black Swan

4. Tomas Alfredson, Tinker Tailor Soldier Spy
 
5. Lars von Trier, Melancholia
 
6. Martin Scorsese, Hugo
 
7. David Michod, Animal Kingdom
 
8. Joel and Ethan Coen, True Grit
 
9. Lynne Ramsay, We Need to Talk About Kevin

10. Takeshi Miike, 13 Assassins

Top 10 Actors
1. Ryan Gosling, Drive
 
2. Michael Shannon, Take Shelter
 
3. Gary Oldman, Tinker Tailor Soldier Spy
 
4. Colin Firth, The King's Speech
 
5. Nick Nolte, Warrior
 
6. Brendan Gleeson, The Guard
 
7. Aidan Gillen, Treacle Jr
 
8. Jeff Bridges, True Grit
 
9. Dominic Cooper, The Devil's Double
 
10. Neil Maskell, Kill List tied with Peter Mullan, Tyrannosaur

Top 10 Actresses
1. Jessica Chastain, The Tree of Life
 
2. Tilda Swinton, We Need to Talk About Kevin
 
3. Natalie Portman, Black Swan
 
4. Michelle Williams, Blue Valentine
 
5. Kirsten Dunst, Melancholia
 
6. Emily Watson, Oranges and Sunshine
 
7. Hailee Steinfeld, True Grit
 
8. Olivia Colman, Tyrannosaur
 
9. Jacki Weaver, Animal Kingdom tie with Yun Jung-hee, Poetry
 
10. Viola Davis, The Help

Top 10 Documentaries

1. Senna
 
2. Project Nim
 
3. Inside Job
 
4. Cave of Forgotten Dreams
 
5. Knuckle
 
6. Bobby Fischer Against the World
 
7. Pina
 
8. Page One: Inside the New York Times
 
9. TT3D: Closer to the Edge
 
10. Tabloid

Top 10 Breakthrough
1. Jessica Chastain, The Tree of Life - The Help - Take Shelter
 
2. John Michael McDonagh, The Guard
 
3. Richard Ayoade, Submarine
 
4. Hailee Steinfeld, True Grit
 
5. Carmel Winters, Snap
 
6. Asif Kapadia, Senna
 
7. Juanita Wilson, As If I Am Not There
 
8. Ben Wheatley, Kill List
 
9. Paddy Considine, Tyrannosaur tie with Justin Kurzel, Snowtown
 
10. Stephanie Sigman, Miss Bala

Best Irish Documentary
Knuckle

Best Irish Breakthrough
John Michael McDonagh, The Guard

References

External links
Official site

2011 film awards
December 2011 events in Europe
2011 in Ireland